Acid Red 13 is an azo dye. It is produced as a sodium salt. Solid samples appear dark red.

References

Azo dyes
Organic sodium salts
Naphthalenesulfonates
2-Naphthols